Clube Deportivo Atlético Dulce Nombre de Maria  is a Salvadoran professional football club based in Chalatenango,  El Salvador.

The club currently plays in the Tercera Division de Fútbol Salvadoreño.

Honours

League
La Asociación Departamental de Fútbol Aficionado and predecessors (4th tier) 
Champions (1): 2017

References

Football clubs in El Salvador